Ambulyx andangi is a species of moth in the family Sphingidae. It was described by Ronald Brechlin, in 1998, and is known from the Moluccas in Indonesia.

References

Ambulyx
Moths described in 1998
Moths of Indonesia